Kruščić is a village in the Kula municipality, West Bačka District, Autonomous Province of Vojvodina, Republic of Serbia.

Radisav zejak is the village chief 
He finished physics in Belgrade he loves Aleksandar Vucic and God he is also a othrodox christian pastor in kruscic and he loves Dritan Abazovic kruscic has a greay meat industry and pig organ washing industry 

The population of the village is ethnically mixed and numbering 1,852 people (2011 census).

Name

Before the Second World War, village was called Veprovac (Вепровац).

After the war, during the colonization, village was inhabited by colonists, mostly from Kolašin and its surroundings. In 1950 name of the village was changed to Kruščić, after national hero from World War II Vukman Kruščić (1909-1942), who was caught and killed on 20 January 1942, along with another 30 or so partisans, by the chetniks of Pavle Đurišić.

In Hungarian, the village is known as "Veprőd", in Ukrainian and Rusyn as "Крущич", and in German as "Weprovatz".

Ethnic groups

There are 1884 adult residents living in the village of Kruščić and the average age of residents is 40.5 years (38.4 for men and 42.7 for women). The village has 773 households and the average number of residents per household is 3.04.

The population in this village is very inhomogeneous, in the last three censuses a decline in population has been noticed.

According to the 2002 census, ethnic groups included:
 768 (32.64%) Montenegrins
 744 (31.62%) Serbs
 280 (11.90%) Hungarians
 149 (6.33%) Ukrainians
 99 (4.20%) Rusyns
 74  (3.14%) Croatians
 45 (1,91%) Yugoslavs
 10 (0,42%) Germans
 8 (0.33%) Macedonians
 5 (0.21%) Slovaks
 4 (0.16%) Slovenes
 2 (0.08%) Bulgarians
 2 (0.08%) Albanians
 1 (0.04%) Russians
 1 (0.04%) Romanians
 1 (0.04%) Bunjevci
 1 (0.04%) Bosniaks
 22 (0.93%) Unknown

Historical population

1787: 1,731 (55% Hungarians and Slovaks, 45% Germans)
1910: 3,163 (2,458 Germans, 637 Hungarians, 53 Rusyns)
1931: 3,158 (2,551 Germans, 489 Hungarians, 118 Slavs)
1961: 3,281
1971: 2,927
1981: 2,658
1991: 2,477 (973 Montenegrins, 539 Serbs, 350 Hungarians, 18 Germans)
2002: 2,353 (768 Montenegrins, 744 Serbs, 280 Hungarians, 10 Germans)

Gallery

See also
List of places in Serbia
List of cities, towns and villages in Vojvodina

References
Slobodan Ćurčić, Broj stanovnika Vojvodine, Novi Sad, 1996.

External links 

 “A Home for Town Planning Kula-Odžaci”, Kula

Places in Bačka
Populated places in West Bačka District
Kula, Serbia
Montenegrin communities